Bohumil Honzátko (30 December 1875 – 12 December 1950) was a Czech gymnast and long-distance runner. He competed for Bohemia at the 1906, 1908 and 1912 Summer Olympics and for Czechoslovakia at the 1924 Summer Olympics.

References

External links
 
 

1875 births
1950 deaths
Athletes (track and field) at the 1912 Summer Olympics
Athletes (track and field) at the 1924 Summer Olympics
Gymnasts at the 1906 Intercalated Games
Gymnasts at the 1908 Summer Olympics
Gymnasts at the 1912 Summer Olympics
Czech male long-distance runners
Czech male marathon runners
Czechoslovak male artistic gymnasts
Olympic athletes of Bohemia
Olympic athletes of Czechoslovakia
Olympic gymnasts of Bohemia
People from Brandýs nad Labem-Stará Boleslav
Sportspeople from the Central Bohemian Region
Sportspeople from the Austro-Hungarian Empire